Transport in Greece has undergone significant changes in the past two decades, vastly modernizing the country's infrastructure and transportation. Although ferry transport between islands remains the prominent method of transport between the nation's islands, improvements to the road infrastructure, rail, urban transport, and airports have all led to a vast improvement in transportation. These upgrades have played a key role in supporting Greece's economy, which in the past decade has come to rely heavily on the construction industry.

Cable transport

Lycabettus Funicular
Parnitha Funitel
Santorini cable car

Rail transport

Railways

total: , ( are, or will be, electrified) 
standard gauge:   gauge 
narrow gauge:   gauge;   gauge 
dual gauge:  combined  and  gauges (three rail system) (2004)
The state-owned company that owns and maintains Greece's railway network is OSE, while TrainOSE is the company responsible for operating all passenger and freight trains.

Metro

Cities with a rapid transit railway network:
Athens Metro (3 lines) (another one under construction)
Thessaloniki Metro (2 lines) ( both under construction)

Commuter rail

Cities with a commuter rail network (Proastiakos):
Athens (5 lines)
Thessaloniki (2 lines)
Patras (2 lines)

Tram

Athens Tram
List of town tramway systems in Greece

Road transport

Highways

As of 2017, Greece has 2500 km of motorways.

Roads:
total: 117,000 km
paved: 107,406 km
unpaved: 9,594 km (1996 est.)
over 2500 tunnels (est.)

Bus transport

Urban bus transport

OSY subsidiary of OASA organizes mass bus (Busses and trolleybuses) transit in Athens.
OASTH organizes mass bus transit in Thessaloniki.
Companies named Astiko KTEL provide mass bus transit in many of the other cities of Greece.

Intercity and regional bus transport

KTEL is the common name for every company which is responsible for intercity and regional bus transit. Most of the regional units, though, have their own regional network of buses, and have their regional unit names labeled on KTEL vehicles that operate there. (e.g. KTEL Argolidas).

There are 4 major bus terminals in Greece, the biggest is in Thessaloniki (Macedonia Inter city bus terminal) which serves all of Greece while Athens has 2 separate bus terminals serving different parts of Greece (Kifissos bus terminal and Liossion bus terminal). A new Athens bus terminal in Elaionas will replace the two separate terminals and serve all of Greece with completion by 2025. A new bus terminal in Patras which will replace the old one is currently under construction in Agios Dionyssios just 200m from the current one and it will open in early 2023 after many delays due to COVID-19 pandemic and the 2022 Russian invasion of Ukraine.

Water transport

Waterways

The 80 km system consists of three coastal canals including the Corinth Canal (6 km) and three unconnected rivers.

The Corinth Canal crosses the Isthmus of Corinth, connecting the Gulf of Corinth with the Saronic Gulf; and shortens the sea voyage from the Adriatic to Piraeus by 325 km.

Ports and harbours

Alexandroupoli
Argostoli
Elefsina
Ermoupolis
Heraklion, Crete
Kalamata
Kavala
Kerkyra
Kos
Chalkis
Igoumenitsa
Lavrio
Patras
Piraeus
Port of Thessaloniki
Volos
Katakolo
Mykonos
Mytilene
Rhodes (city)
Souda
Syros

Merchant marine
ships by type  (1999 est.)
bulk carrier: 273
cargo ship: 60
chemical tanker: 22
combination bulk: 5
combination ore/oil: 8
container ship: 43
Liquified Gas Carrier: 5
multi-functional large load carrier: 1
passenger ship: 12
passenger/cargo: 2
petroleum tanker: 245
refrigerated cargo: 3
roll-on/roll-off ship: 19
short-sea passenger: 75
specialized tanker: 4
vehicle carrier: 2

Airports

total: 82 (2005)
With paved runways: 67
over 3,047 m: 5 
2,438–3,047 m: 16 
1,524–2,437 m: 19 
914–1,523 m: 17 
under 914 m: 10 (2005)
With unpaved runways: 15
914 to 1,523 m: 3
under 914 m: 12 (2005)
heliports: 8 (2005)

Pipelines
crude oil: 26 km
petroleum products: 547 km

Major construction projects

Completed projects

Motorways
Central Greece Motorway
Egnatia Odos  670 km (420 mi)
Motorway 25 
Motorway 29 77 km (48 mi)
Ionia Odos "196 km (122 mi)"
Motorway 1 (ATHE) 550 km (340 mi)
Attiki Odos 69.7 km (43.3 mi)
Moreas Motorway 205 km (127 mi)
Olympia Odos 210 km (130 mi)
Rio–Antirrio bridge  2,880 metre long (9,449 ft) (2nd longest cable bridge in Europe

Railways
Athens Airport–Patras railway (completed until Aigio)
Thessaloniki–Alexandroupoli railway
Athens Metro
Line 1
Line 2
Line 3
Athens Tram

Ports and harbours
Pireaus Port
Rafina Port
Lavrion Port

Airports
Athens International Airport
Thessaloniki Airport - "Makedonia"

Projects under construction

North Road Axis of Crete
Branches of Egnatia Odos
Motorway 21

Motorway 27

Motorway 71

Railways
Construction and electrification of extension to Patras of Athens Airport–Patras railway
Line 3 (Athens Metro) extension to Dimotiko Theatro
Line 4 (Athens Metro)
Thessaloniki Metro
Athens Tram extension to Piraeus

Ports and harbours

Airports
New Heraklion Airport in Kasteli

Future projects

Motorways
Larisa–Kozane Motorway

Railways
Line 4
Igoumenitsa–Ioannina–Kalampaka line
Kalampaka–Kastoria line
Florina–Pogradec line
Kalamaka–Kozani–Thessaloniki–Kavala–Toxotes line
Ioannina–Rio line
Thessaloniki–Chalkidiki line
Thessaloniki–Giannitsa–Skydra line
Chania–Rethymnon–Herakleion line
Thessaloniki Tram
Heraklion Tram
Patras Tram
Larisa Tram
Ioannina Tram
Volos Tram

Airports

See also
Rapid transit in Greece
Greek shipping
 Plug-in electric vehicles in Greece

References

External links
 www.Greek-Motorway.Net
The Hellenic Merchant Maritime Sector: A Historical and Business Overview (Balkanalysis.com)